East Tāmaki Heights is an eastern suburb of Auckland, New Zealand.

The earliest houses date from the 1880s, but most of the houses were built in the 2000s. Between 1998 and 2009, the major streets were defined.

Demographics

East Tāmaki Heights had a population of 2,751 at the 2018 New Zealand census, an increase of 192 people (7.5%) since the 2013 census, and an increase of 558 people (25.4%) since the 2006 census. There were 813 households, comprising 1,329 males and 1,422 females, giving a sex ratio of 0.93 males per female. The median age was 40.0 years (compared with 37.4 years nationally), with 486 people (17.7%) aged under 15 years, 597 (21.7%) aged 15 to 29, 1,335 (48.5%) aged 30 to 64, and 333 (12.1%) aged 65 or older.

Ethnicities were 41.4% European/Pākehā, 3.7% Māori, 2.8% Pacific peoples, 53.3% Asian, and 4.9% other ethnicities. People may identify with more than one ethnicity.

The percentage of people born overseas was 51.6, compared with 27.1% nationally.

Although some people chose not to answer the census's question about religious affiliation, 44.7% had no religion, 30.5% were Christian, 0.1% had Māori religious beliefs, 8.5% were Hindu, 3.7% were Muslim, 3.9% were Buddhist and 3.9% had other religions.

Of those at least 15 years old, 705 (31.1%) people had a bachelor's or higher degree, and 276 (12.2%) people had no formal qualifications. The median income was $35,500, compared with $31,800 nationally. 537 people (23.7%) earned over $70,000 compared to 17.2% nationally. The employment status of those at least 15 was that 1,116 (49.3%) people were employed full-time, 366 (16.2%) were part-time, and 60 (2.6%) were unemployed.

References

Suburbs of Auckland
Howick Local Board Area